Ricardo Lopes Pereira or simply Ricardo Lopes (born 28 October 1990) is a Brazilian professional footballer who plays for Vorskla Poltava.

Career
Ricardo Lopes Pereira started his career with regional lower league side Ituano where he made his debut on 8 February 2012 in a Campeonato Paulista league game against Bragantino that ended in a 4–1 defeat. The following season he joined a national league club in Gurupi, who were playing in the Campeonato Brasileiro Série D before having spells at Globo and Campeonato Brasileiro Série C club Fortaleza in the 2014 league season. His time at Globo and in particular his 2014 campaign with them where he achieved a personal best of 23 goals in one season attracted the interests of top tier South Korean football club Jeju United who he joined on loan on 6 January 2015. After establishing himself as Jeju United's top goalscorer in the 2015 K League Classic season, the reigning league champions Jeonbuk Hyundai Motors signed him for 1.5 million USD. On 15 February 2020, Ricardo Lopes joined top tier Chinese football club Shanghai SIPG. He joined J2 League club JEF United Chiba on 15 July 2022.

Career statistics
.

Honours
Jeonbuk Hyundai Motors
K League 1: 2017, 2018, 2019
AFC Champions League: 2016

Individual
K League 1 Best XI: 2016, 2018

References

External links

1990 births
Living people
Brazilian footballers
Association football wingers
Association football forwards
K League 1 players
Chinese Super League players
J2 League players
Ituano FC players
Fortaleza Esporte Clube players
Jeju United FC players
Jeonbuk Hyundai Motors players
Shanghai Port F.C. players
JEF United Chiba players
Brazilian expatriate footballers
Brazilian expatriate sportspeople in China
Expatriate footballers in China
Brazilian expatriate sportspeople in South Korea
Expatriate footballers in South Korea
Brazilian expatriate sportspeople in Japan
Expatriate footballers in Japan